Drovers Inn, also known as the Jesse Bentley House, is a historic inn and tavern located in East Fallowfield Township, Chester County, Pennsylvania.  It was built about 1820, and is a two- to three-story, six bay, banked stuccoed stone structure with a gable roof.  It features a full width verandah with a hipped roof.

It was added to the National Register of Historic Places in 1985.

References

Hotel buildings on the National Register of Historic Places in Pennsylvania
Hotel buildings completed in 1820
Buildings and structures in Chester County, Pennsylvania
National Register of Historic Places in Chester County, Pennsylvania